Pierluigi Consonni (14 January 1949 – 24 March 2020) was an Italian professional footballer who played as a defender.

Career 
Consonni grew up with Ponte San Pietro, where he made his debut in the regional championships and later in Serie D, a category in which he also played in the 1970-1971 season with the Trevigliese.

After a year with Derthona in Serie C, he moved to Bari where he played two championships in Serie B, totaling 65 appearances among cadets, and three more in Serie C.

He then played in Serie C with Salernitana and ended his career in 1980, playing with Pergocrema.

He died in his native Ponte San Pietro on 24 March 2020, aged 71, after contracting COVID-19 during the pandemic in Italy. Five days earlier Innocenzo Donina, also a former Bari player and also from the province of Bergamo, had succumbed to the same illness.

References

Bibliography 
 Arrigo Beltrami, Almanacco Illustrato del Calcio, Edizioni Panini, Modena 1974
 Arrigo Beltrami, Almanacco Illustrato del Calcio, Edizioni Panini, Modena 1975

External links
 

1949 births
2020 deaths
People from Ponte San Pietro
Sportspeople from the Province of Bergamo
Italian footballers
Footballers from Lombardy
Association football defenders
Serie B players
Serie C players
Serie D players
S.S.C. Bari players
A.S.D. HSL Derthona players
U.S. Salernitana 1919 players
A.C. Ponte San Pietro Isola S.S.D. players
U.S. Pergolettese 1932 players
Deaths from the COVID-19 pandemic in Lombardy